The Great Russian Encyclopedia (GRE; , БРЭ, transliterated as Bolshaya rossiyskaya entsiklopediya or academically as  Bolšaja rossijskaja enciklopedija) is a universal Russian encyclopedia, completed in 36 volumes, published between 2004 and 2017 by Great Russian Encyclopedia, JSC (transliterated as Bolshaya rossiyskaya entsiklopediya PAO). It was released under the auspices of the Russian Academy of Sciences (RAS) after President Vladimir Putin signed a presidential decree №1156 in 2002. The complete edition was released by 2017.

The chief editor of the encyclopedia was Yury Osipov, the president of the RAS. The editorial board had more than 80 RAS members, including the Nobel Prize laureates Zhores Alferov and Vitaly Ginzburg.

The first, introductory volume, released in 2004, was dedicated to Russia. Thirty-five volumes were released between 2005 and 2017, covering the range from "A" to "Яя" (Yaya). The RAS plans to publish an updated version every five years, although it may not be issued in print after the first edition.

Personnel and management

Contributors
The GRE print version has many contributors eminent in their fields, such as Nobel Laureate physicist Zhores Alferov, theoretical physicist and astrophysicist Vitaly Ginzburg.

Editorial board
Yury Osipov, a mathematician, President of RAS (1991-2013), is the GRE Editor in Chief and Chairman of the Scientific Editorial Board.

Managing editor is Sergey Kravets, journalist, editor and cultural figure.

Also in the scientific editorial board are or were:
 RAS Academics:
Sergey S. Averintsev,
Eugene N. Avrorin,
Sergei I. Adian,
Yuri P. Altukhov,
Zhores I. Alferov,
Boris V. Anan'ich,
Alexander F. Andreev,
Leo N. Andreev,
Dmitry V. Anosov,
Vladimir I. Arnold,
Sergey N. Bagaev,
Nikolai Bahvalov,
Oleg A. Bogatikov,
Alexander A. Boyarchuk,
Evgeny Velikhov,
Vladimir A. Vinogradov,
Andrei I. Vorobyov,
Eric M. Galimov,
Andrey V. Gaponov-Grekhov,
Mikhail L. Gasparov, 
Vitaly L. Ginzburg,
Georgy S. Golitsyn, 
Andrei A. Gonchar, 
Anatoly I. Grigoriev, 
Abdusalam A. Guseinov, 
Mikhail I. Davydov, 
Anatoly P. Derevyanko, 
Nikolai L. Dobretsov, 
Yuri I. Zhuravlev, 
Nicholas S. Zefirov, 
Yuri A. Zolotov, 
Viktor P. Ivannikov, 
Vadim T. Ivanov, 
Sergei G. Inge-Vechtomov, 
Alexander S. Isaev, 
Victor A. Kabanov, 
Eugene N. Kablov, 
Sergei P. Karpov, 
Lev L. Kiselev, 
Alex E. Kontorovich, 
Vladimir M. Kotlyakov, 
Oleg N. Krokhin, 
Edward P. Kruglyakov, 
Alexander B. Kudelin, 
Oleg Y. Kutafin, 
Nikolai P. Laverov, 
Viktor P. Legostaev, 
Nikolai P. Liakishev, 
Valery L. Makarov, 
Alexander M. Matveenko, 
Gennady A. Mesyats, 
Alexander D. Nekipelov, 
Alexei V. Nikolaev, 
Sergey P. Novikov, 
Yuri S. Osipov,
Dmitry S. Pavlov, 
Alexey N. Parshin, 
Nikolai A. Plate, 
Nikolai N. Ponomarev-Steppe, 
Yuri V. Prokhorov, 
Alexei Y. Rozanov, 
Valery A. Rubakov, 
Alexander Y. Rumyantsev, 
Dmitry V. Rundkvist, 
Gennady I. Savin, 
Victor A. Sadovnichii, 
Alexander N. Skrinsky, 
Alexander S. Spirin, 
Yuri S. Stepanov, 
Vyacheslav S. Stepin, 
Michael L. Titarenko, 
Valery A. Tishkov, 
Yuri D. Tretyakov, 
Kliment N. Trubetskoy, 
Oleg H. Favorsky, 
Ludvig D. Faddeev, 
Vladimir Ye. Fortov,
Konstantin V. Frolov, 
Yuri I. Chernov, 
Gorimir G. Chernii, 
Alexander O. Chubarian, 
Vitaly D. Shafranov, 
Sergey V. Shestakov, 
Dmitry V. Shirkov.
 RAS Corresponding Members:
Boris A. Babayan,
Vladimir I. Vasiliev,
Piama P. Gaidenko,
Rudolf V. Kamelin,
Michael V. Kovalchuk,
Nikolai I. Lapin,
Sergey S. Lappo,
Alexey V. Yablokov.
 Russian Academy of Agricultural Sciences Academician:
Vladimir I. Fisinin.
 Russian Academy of Arts Academician:
Dmitry O. Shvidkovskiy .
 Russian Federation Statesmen:
Aleksandr A. Avdeyev (Culture Minister in 2008–2012),
Andrei A. Fursenko (Minister of Education and Science of the Russian Federation in 2004–2012),
Andrei A. Kokoshin (Secretary of the Russian Security Council in 1998), 
Sergey E. Naryshkin (Head of the Presidential Administration of the Russian Federation in 2008–2011, Chairman of the State Duma of the Russian Federation since 2011), 
Alexander S. Sokolov (musicologist, Culture Minister in 2004-2008), 
Sergey K. Shoigu (Minister of Emergency Situations of the Russian Federation in 1994–2012, Defense Minister from 2012),
Mikhail E. Shvydkoi (Culture Minister in 2000–2004),
Alexander D. Zhukov (Deputy Prime Minister in 2004–2011).
 and also:
Alexei D. Bogaturov,
Sergey V. Chemezov,
Vladimir V. Grigoriev, 
Alexei I. Komech, 
Vladimir A. Mau, 
D. L. Orlov.

Edition summary
Publication schedule and contents of volumes:

Electronic version
From April 2016, an electronic version of the Great Russian Encyclopedia is available, with 12,000 articles at launch.

Criticism
One criticism of the encyclopedia is that it is an unnecessary prestige project in the era when all major encyclopedias went online.

See also
Great Soviet Encyclopedia

References

External links
 
Other official website

2004 non-fiction books
Russian-language encyclopedias
Russian encyclopedias
21st-century encyclopedias